Claus Hansen (died 8 February 1706) was Governor of the Danish West Indies from 19 February 1702 until his death.

Hansen started his career in the West Indies as one of the soldiers brought by Jørgen Thormøhlen on the latters lesseeship in 1690. He was promoted to ensign in 1692 by Governor Frans de la Vigne.

In 1699 Hansen married Anna van Ockeren, the widow of Iver Jørgensen Dyppel, son of deceased Governor Jørgen Iversen Dyppel. She died the same year, leaving him the Dyppel fortune.

Upon John Lorentz' death on 19 February 1702, the planters named Hansen as governor, whereas the colony officials decided upon Joachim von Holten. However, the Danish West India Company sided with Hansen, and he was installed in office. He died only four years later, on 8 February  1706. 

His legacy according to Dansk Biografisk Lexikon is the institution of the island councils.

Bibliography 
 C. F. Bricka (editor), Dansk biografisk Lexikon, first edition, 19 volumes, 1887–1905, Vol. VI. Online edition available: http://runeberg.org/dbl/6/ (page 608. Numbered as 610 in the online edition).

Governors of the Danish West Indies
Year of birth unknown
1706 deaths
17th-century Danish military personnel
18th-century Danish military personnel
18th century in the Danish West Indies
18th-century Danish politicians